Sir Henry Langford, 3rd Baronet (circa 1655 – 1725) was an Anglo-Irish politician.

Langford was the younger son of Sir Hercules Langford, 1st Baronet and Mary Upton. He entered the Middle Temple in London in 1677 and was called to the bar there in 1682. He was High Sheriff of Meath in 1690. He was a Member of Parliament for St Johnstown, County Donegal in the Irish House of Commons between 1695 and 1699. He purchased an estate at Kingskerswell, Devon, in 1710 and was High Sheriff of Devon in 1716.

In 1716 he succeeded to his brother's baronetcy; the title became extinct upon Langford's death.

References

17th-century births
1725 deaths
17th-century Anglo-Irish people
18th-century Anglo-Irish people
Baronets in the Baronetage of Ireland
High Sheriffs of Devon
High Sheriffs of Meath
Irish MPs 1695–1699
Members of the Parliament of Ireland (pre-1801) for County Donegal constituencies